Ebara Corporation is a Japanese company.

Ebara may also refer to:
Ebara, Tokyo, a district in Tokyo, Japan

People with the surname
Masashi Ebara
Ebara Soroku

Train stations
Ebara Station, a station in Toyooka, Hyogo
Ebaramachi Station, a station in Shinagawa, Tokyo
Ebara-Nakanobu Station, a station in Shinagawa, Tokyo
Etchū-Ebara Station, a station in Toyama, Toyama
Sōunnosato-Ebara Station, a station in Ibara, Okayama